Tang Hongwei (born 15 April 1961) is a Chinese rower. He competed in the men's coxless four event at the 1984 Summer Olympics.

References

1961 births
Living people
Chinese male rowers
Olympic rowers of China
Rowers at the 1984 Summer Olympics
Place of birth missing (living people)
Asian Games medalists in rowing
Rowers at the 1986 Asian Games
Asian Games silver medalists for China
Medalists at the 1986 Asian Games
20th-century Chinese people
21st-century Chinese people